Country Hits is the fifth compilation album by Anne Murray, released in 1987 by Capitol Records.

Track listing

All track information and credits were taken from the CD liner notes.

References

External links
Anne Murray Official Site
Capitol Records Official Site

1987 compilation albums
Anne Murray compilation albums
Capitol Records compilation albums